Travis May (Born ) is an American entrepreneur. He is the co-founder and president of Datavant and previously co-founded and was the CEO of LiveRamp.

Early life 
May was born in North Carolina and grew up in Cary. He attended Cary Academy, graduating in 2005. While in high school, he was a member of a four-person team that won the mid-Atlantic regional and competed in the 2005 National Economics Challenge.

May attended Harvard College, graduating in 2009 with degrees in economics and marketing, Magna cum laude. During his freshman year, he co-founded the Harvard Entrepreneurial Forum. When he was a sophomore, he created the website IvyAdmits.com, which featured examples of successful college application essays from Ivy League students. Later, he co-founded the i3 The Harvard College Innovation Challenge, a student startup competition, which continues annually with support from the Technology and Entrepreneurship Center at Harvard.

Career 
When he was a student at Harvard in 2007, May co-founded Campus Venture Network Inc with Vivek G. Ramaswamy. May was the company's CEO. May and Ramaswamy created StudentBusinesses.com, a closed social network that paired students who had business ideas with potential investors. The website was tested at Harvard and the University of North Carolina at Chapel Hill and expanded to Duke University, the Massachusetts Institute of Technology, Stanford University, Yale University, and several hundred students in India. In 2009, the Ewing Marion Kauffman Foundation purchased Campus Venture Network and its StudentBusinesses.com for an undisclosed amount. The platform evolved into YouNoodle and continues to be used for the i3 competition at Harvard.

After graduating, May took the position of vice president of product at Rapleaf, a small start-up company co-founded by Auren Hoffman in San Francisco. In 2011, May co-founded LiveRamp with Hoffman and was its vice president of product. LiveRap was a Silicon Valley-based start-up company that provided data onboarding. After three years, Acxiom purchased LiveRamp for $310 million. May became acting president of Acxiom and CEO of its LiveRamp division for eight years.

Hoffman, who left LiveRamp with the buyout, noted that Acxiom trusted the team who created LiveRamp, giving May a "very long rope." Between 2015 and 2016, LiveRamp generated $90 million in revenue. By 2017, it was worth more than $1.5 billion. Its customers included Adobe, American Express, and Google. However, Acxiom hired a new CEO and reassigned May to the new position of chief growth officer in September 2017. Although May was allowed to spend some work time on his new start-up, he resigned from Acxiom in April 2018.

In September 2017, May became the CEO of Datavant, a San Francisco-based biotech company he co-founded with his former business partner Ramaswamy. May made a “significant personal investment” in Datavant which was initially supported by Roivant Sciences, a healthcare company owned by Ramaswamy. In 2018, May helped lead a $40.5 million financing round, securing investments from Cigna Ventures and Johnson & Johnson Innovation. Datavant entered into a $7 billion merger with Ciox Health in 2021. After the merger, May stepped down as CEO, becoming the president of the company's board of directors. He is also a board member of Convenet, a health technology infrastructure company based in the United Kingdom acquired by Datavant in 2022.

Honors 
 In 2016, Forbes magazine named May to its 30 Under 30: Marketing & Advertising list 
 Ad Age named May to its 40 Under 40 List in 2016.

Personal life 
May married Holly Metter, a graduate of Cary Academy and Harvard, on the Cary Academy campus in 2012. She is in charge of human resources for Datavant. In 2019, the couple donated $500,000 to Cary Academy, establishing the Metter May Scholarship which provides full tuition for financially disadvantaged students. May was a sponsor of the i3 The Harvard College Innovation Challenge in 2021.

References

External links 

 May, Travis. "Why I Decided to Work at a Startup after Graduating." VentureBeat, (March 31, 2011)

Date of birth missing (living people)
Living people
People from Cary, North Carolina
Harvard College alumni
21st-century American businesspeople
American technology company founders
American technology chief executives
American marketing businesspeople
Year of birth missing (living people)